Șipot may refer to the following places in Romania:

Șipot, a village in the commune Pietrari, Dâmbovița County
 Șipot, a tributary of the Crișul Repede in Cluj County
 Șipot, a small river in the city of Brașov

See also 
 Șipotu (disambiguation)
 Șipotu River (disambiguation)
 Șipotele River (disambiguation)